Hill Country Christian School of Austin is a private, classical, college-preparatory Christian school for students in grades PK-12.  It is located in Austin, Texas.  The school is a program of Hill Country Bible Church Austin and is housed at the church's Lakeline campus.

Athletics
Hill Country Christian School participates in the Texas Association of Private and Parochial Schools (TAPPS).  
They compete at the 4A level in TAPPS at the high school level.

References

External links
School website
School's page at education.com

Christian schools in Texas
Schools in Williamson County, Texas
Education in Austin, Texas
Private K-12 schools in Texas
Educational institutions established in 1996
1996 establishments in Texas